Robertinho is a Portuguese nickname for the name Roberto. Notable people with the name include:

 Robertinho Silva (born 1941), Brazilian jazz drummer
 Robertinho do Recife (born 1953), Brazilian guitarist and composer
 Robertinho (footballer, born 1960), full name Roberto Oliveira Gonçalves do Carmo, Brazilian football manager and former striker
 Robertinho (footballer, born 1988), full name Roberto Soares Anghinetti, Brazilian football winger

See also
Roberto